El Dorado High School (EHS) is a public secondary school in El Dorado, Kansas, United States.  It is operated by El Dorado USD 490 public school district, and serves students of grades 9 to 12. Mascot is Wildcats, and the school colors are red and black.

Administration
El Dorado High School is currently under the leadership of Principal Bruce Lolling. The athletic director is Scott Vang. The superintendent is Teresa Tosh.

Extracurricular Activities
El Dorado High School offers a variety of extra curricular activities. A list is listed below:

Athletics

Fall
 Cross Country
 Girls Tennis
 Fall Cheerleading
 Football
 Volleyball
 Boys Soccer

Winter
 Boys Basketball
 Winter Cheerleading
 Wrestling
 Bowling
 Boys Swimming

Spring
 Baseball
 Softball
 Track and Field
 Boys Tennis
 Girls Soccer
 Girls Swimming

Clubs

 Band
 Circle of Friends
 Drama/Thespians
 E-Club
 EHS Business Club
 Encore
 Forensics
 KAY Club
 National Honor Society
 Orchestra
Policy Debate (CX)
 Scholar's Bowl
 Student Council
 World Cultures Club

Notable alumni
 Bobby Douglass, ex-professional football player with the Chicago Bears
 Stanley Dunham, maternal grandfather of U.S. President Barack Obama
 Larry Hartshorn, professional football player with the Chicago Cardinals

See also
 List of high schools in Kansas
 List of unified school districts in Kansas

References

External links

School
 School Website
 El Dorado Public Schools USD 490
Maps
 USD 490 School District Boundary Map, KDOT
 El Dorado City Map, KDOT

Public high schools in Kansas
Schools in Butler County, Kansas
El Dorado, Kansas